Academy Fjord or Academy Bay is a fjord in northern Greenland. Administratively it belongs to the Avannaata municipality.

The fjord was named by Robert Peary after the Philadelphia Academy of Natural Sciences.

Geography
The Academy Fjord opens to the northwest into the inner end of the Inglefield Gulf, close to its head and south of the Harvard Islands. The northeastern one, Nunatarsuaq, is a nunatak dotted with lakes. The southwestern side of the fjord is fringed by a continuous wall of almost vertical cliffs extending from a promontory at the mouth of the fjord beyond the head into the glacier area. The northeastern side of the fjord is also flanked by cliffs, but near the mouth it is cut by a few deep valleys through which the inner Nunatarsuaq plateau is accessible.

The head of the fjord is close to the head of Olrik Fjord, where the Leidy Glacier discharges from the Greenland Ice Sheet through the Academy Glacier into both fjords.

See also
List of fjords of Greenland

References

External links
Qaanaaq 2001: mineral exploration reconnaissance in North-West Greenland

Fjords of Greenland